Michel de Ré  (25 February 1925 - 15 March 1979) was a French actor and theatre director. A grandson of Marshal Joseph Gallieni, he was until 1950 the husband of Heddy Einstein, daughter of the painter William Einstein, and afterwards compagnon of the comedian Martine Sarcey.

External links 
 Michel de Ré sur Les Archives du spectacle

French male film actors
French male stage actors
French theatre directors
Male actors from Paris
1925 births
1979 deaths